The fifth season of the American science fiction television series Star Trek: The Next Generation commenced airing in broadcast syndication in the United States on September 23, 1991, and concluded on June 15, 1992, after airing 26 episodes. Set in the 24th century, the series follows the adventures of the crew of the Starfleet starship Enterprise-D. This season is notable among Star Trek fans as the season when Gene Roddenberry died of cardiac arrest on October 24, 1991. Production on the episode "Hero Worship", directed by Patrick Stewart, was halted when news reached the set.

The premiere episode resolves the cliffhanger from the previous season, revealing the mysterious Romulan commander to be the daughter of the Lt. Tasha Yar from the alternate universe created in the third season episode "Yesterday's Enterprise".

This season sees Picard have some of the more memorable experiences of the series, such as learning to communicate with the heretofore unintelligible Tamarians ("Darmok"), overcoming his dislike of children when he is trapped along with three children after the Enterprise-D is struck by a quantum filament ("Disaster"), and meeting with Ambassador Spock on Romulus in "Unification". Most notably, in "The Inner Light", he experiences 40 or so years of life as an iron weaver on an extinct alien world after an encounter with a probe launched before the destruction of that world.

Michelle Forbes joined the cast as Ensign Ro Laren, a Bajoran officer who was initially conceived to be one of the main characters in the upcoming spin-off Deep Space Nine. Wesley also makes a few appearances in this season when he saves the Enterprise from an alien game which was actually a mind-control device ("The Game"), and later at Starfleet Academy when he participates in a coverup of the circumstances surrounding the death of one of his classmates ("The First Duty").

The season ends with the discovery of Data's head in a cave under San Francisco which had been sealed for 500 years, and eventually with Data, Picard, La Forge, Troi, Riker, and Doctor Crusher trapped in 19th century Earth ("Time's Arrow").

The logo as seen in the opening credits has a minor change this season only, as it has rear shadows.

Cast

Recurring characters

Episodes

In the following table, episodes are listed by the order in which they aired.

Reception
In 2019, CBR rated Season 5 of Star Trek: The Next Generation as the 3rd best season of all Star Trek seasons up to that time, and the most highly ranked season of Star Trek: The Next Generation.

Footnotes

External links
 Episode guide  at Star Trek.com

Star Trek: The Next Generation seasons
1991 American television seasons
1992 American television seasons